Hound Run Airport  is a privately owned, public use airport located five nautical miles (6 mi, 9 km) north of the central business district of Hallettsville, a city in Lavaca County, Texas, United States.

Facilities and aircraft 
Hound Run Airport covers an area of 96 acres (39 ha) at an elevation of 385 feet (117 m) above mean sea level. It has one runway designated 16/34 with a turf surface measuring 2,480 by 75 feet (756 x 23 m).

For the 12-month period ending May 22, 2011, the airport had 500 general aviation aircraft operations, an average of 41 per month. At that time there was one single-engine aircraft based at this airport.

References

External links 
  at Texas DOT Airport Directory
 Aerial image as of January 1996 from USGS The National Map
 Aeronautical chart at SkyVector

Defunct airports in Texas
Airports in Texas
Transportation in Lavaca County, Texas